Saltweed may refer to:

 Any of various plants of the genus  Atriplex
 Blutaparon vermiculare, whose common names include "saltweed"